Whiteout (2005) is an original novel written by James Swallow and based on the long-running British science fiction comic strip Judge Dredd. It is Swallow's second Judge Dredd novel.

Synopsis
A powerful cybernetic weapon is stolen by a criminal. As Judge Dredd tries to retrieve it, Justice Department's shadowy Covert Operations Establishment tries to thwart him, and is willing to stop at nothing – even if it means killing Dredd himself.

External links
 Whiteout at goodreads.com

Novels by James Swallow
Judge Dredd novels